Olivet Presbyterian Church is a historic Presbyterian church located near Providence Forge, New Kent County, Virginia. It was built in 1856, and is a small frame church building in the Greek Revival style.  It features a flush-boarded, pedimented portico with four fluted Greek Doric order columns.

It was listed on the National Register of Historic Places in 1978.

References

Churches on the National Register of Historic Places in Virginia
19th-century Presbyterian church buildings in the United States
Presbyterian churches in Virginia
National Register of Historic Places in New Kent County, Virginia
Greek Revival church buildings in Virginia
Churches completed in 1856
Churches in New Kent County, Virginia